Godspeed is the fourth studio album by Scottish rock band Glasvegas. The album was released across all digital platforms on 2 April 2021 through Go Wow Records, with the CD version of the album released on 20 August 2021 and the vinyl LP version to follow in January 2022. Godspeed is the band's first new studio album in eight years, following 2013's Later...When the TV Turns to Static and the departure of drummer Jonna Löfgren. The album was written, recorded, engineered and produced by lead singer James Allan.

The album cover is from a photo taken in the Lower East Side of New York City by James Allan's friend, Angela McCluskey. The boy in the photo is blind and is being healed by the man in the wheelchair with his father behind him.  The musical theme of the album "takes place" across the course of one evening.

Singles
"Keep Me a Space" was released as the lead single from the album on 14 August 2020 as a digital download and across all digital platforms. This marked the band's first new release in seven years.

"My Body Is a Glasshouse (A Thousand Stones Ago)" was released across all digital platforms on 4 December 2020 as the second single from the album.

"Dying to Live" was released across all digital platforms on 29 January 2021 as the third single from the album.

"Shake the Cage (für Theo)" was released across all digital platforms on 19 March 2021 as the fourth single from the album. The song was featured at the end of the Alan McGee biopic Creation Stories and was the only new contemporary music featured on the movie soundtrack.

Track listing

Charts

References 

2021 albums
Glasvegas albums